Greenbrier (also Green Brier) is an unincorporated community in Greenfield Township, Orange County, in the U.S. state of Indiana.

History
A post office was established at Greenbrier in 1861, and remained in operation until it was discontinued in 1938.

Geography

References

Unincorporated communities in Orange County, Indiana
Unincorporated communities in Indiana
1861 establishments in Indiana